Mehmed Konica (1881 – 1948), was an Albanian politician. He served three times as the Foreign Minister of Albania. He was the brother of Albanian writer Faik Konica.

Konica was born in Konitsa, today's Greece, back then part of the Janina Vilayet of the Ottoman Empire. He was present in the Conference of Ambassadors in London in 1913. He was appointed Foreign Minister on 22 June 1914 for a short period. In 1918, he headed the Congress of Durrës and served again as Foreign Minister. After participating in the Congress of Lushnjë, he was appointed Foreign Minister once more and accompanied Fan Noli on his journey to the League of Nations. On 28 March 1922 he was appointed plenipotentiary Ambassador of Albania in the UK until 21 May 1925. Although originally an opponent of Ahmet Zogu, Konica conducted negotiations in Rome on his behalf in 1926. He served thereafter as an informal political advisor and intermediary and represented Albania at the Balkan Conferences of 1931.

During World War II, Mehmed bey Konica was initially interned in Rome by the Italians and, later, under the German occupation, was appointed Albanian Foreign Minister but refused to take up the position. He died in exile in Rome.

See also
 List of Foreign Ministers of Albania

References

1881 births
1948 deaths
People from Konitsa
People from Janina vilayet
Greek people of Albanian descent
Government ministers of Albania
Foreign ministers of Albania
Ambassadors of Albania to the United Kingdom
19th-century Albanian politicians
20th-century Albanian politicians
Government of Durrës